Roger Federer defeated Juan Martín del Potro in the final, 6–7(5–7), 6–4, 6–3 to win the singles tennis title at the 2017 Swiss Indoors. It was his eighth Swiss Indoors and 95th singles title, surpassing Ivan Lendl for second place in the list for most men's singles titles won in the Open era.

Marin Čilić was the defending champion, but lost in the semifinals to del Potro.

Seeds

Draw

Finals

Top half

Bottom half

Qualifying

Seeds

Qualifiers

Lucky losers

Qualifying draw

First qualifier

Second qualifier

Third qualifier

Fourth qualifier

References
 Main Draw
 Qualifying Draw

Swiss Indoors - Singles